Lorenzo Rajot (born 13 October 1997) is a French professional footballer who plays as a midfielder for Ligue 2 club Rodez.

Career
Rajot made his professional debut for Clermont Foot in a Ligue 2 1–0 win over Valenciennes FC on 19 May 2017.

Rajot joined another Ligue 2 club, Le Mans, in January 2020 on loan with an option to purchase.

On 4 June 2021, he moved to Rodez.

References

External links
 
 
 
 Clermont Foot Profile

1997 births
Living people
Sportspeople from Saint-Cloud
French footballers
Association football midfielders
Clermont Foot players
Le Mans FC players
Rodez AF players
Championnat National 3 players
Ligue 2 players
Footballers from Hauts-de-Seine